Sphenomorphus courcyanus is a species of skink found in Asia.

Distribution
India (Assam), China (S Xizang = Tibet)
Type locality: Rotung, N. Assam

References

 Annandale, Nelson 1912 Zoological results of the Abor Expedition, 1911–1912. Rec. Indian Mus., Calcutta, 8 (1): 7-59 [Reptilia, pages 37–59] (supplement in same journal, 8 (4): 357–358, 1914).
 Chen,S.H. & Lue,K.Y. 1987 A new species of skink, Sphenomorphus taiwanensis, from Taiwan (Sauria, Scincidae). Bull. Inst. Zool. (Acad. Sinica) 26: 115-121
 Smith,M.A. 1937 A review of the genus Lygosoma (Scincida,Reptilia) and its allies. Rec. Ind. Mus. 39 (3): 213-234

courcyanus
Reptiles described in 1912
Taxa named by Nelson Annandale
Reptiles of India
Reptiles of China